3-Hydroxyphenazepam is a benzodiazepine with hypnotic, sedative, anxiolytic, and anticonvulsant properties. It is an active metabolite of phenazepam, as well as the active metabolite of the benzodiazepine prodrug cinazepam. Relative to phenazepam, 3-hydroxyphenazepam has diminished myorelaxant properties, but is about equivalent in most other regards. Like other benzodiazepines, 3-hydroxyphenazepam behaves as a positive allosteric modulator of the benzodiazepine site of the GABAA receptor with an EC50 value of 10.3 nM. It has been sold online as a designer drug.

See also
 Lorazepam, licensed medication
 Nifoxipam
 Nitemazepam

References

Hypnotics
Anticonvulsants
Sedatives
Anxiolytics
Benzodiazepines
GABAA receptor positive allosteric modulators
Chloroarenes
Bromoarenes
Human drug metabolites
Designer drugs
Lactims